Major General Henry Edward Jerome (28 February 1830 – 25 February 1901) was a recipient of the Victoria Cross, the highest and most prestigious award for gallantry in the face of the enemy that can be awarded to British and Commonwealth forces.

Career
Jerome was 28 years old, and a captain in the 86th Regiment of Foot (later The Royal Irish Rifles), British Army during the Indian Mutiny when the following deeds took place at Jhansi, Chandairee and Jumna for which he (and Private James Byrne) were awarded the VC:

Jerome later transferred to the 19th Regiment of Foot and achieved the rank of major general.

References

External links
Location of grave and VC medal (Avon)

British Army major generals
1830 births
1901 deaths
Indian Rebellion of 1857 recipients of the Victoria Cross
86th (Royal County Down) Regiment of Foot officers
Green Howards officers
British West Indies recipients of the Victoria Cross
British Army recipients of the Victoria Cross